Amanda Grosserode (December 11, 1975) is a former Republican member of the Kansas House of Representatives that represented the 16th district in Johnson County, which includes portions of Overland Park and Lenexa. She defeated her Democratic opponent 55%–45% in 2010 with 3% voting and was unopposed for re-election in 2012.

Amanda served as Chairwoman of the Education Budget Committee, and also served on the Education and Appropriations Committee. The American Conservative Union gave her a 100% evaluation every year she was in the legislature.

She was defeated by Democrat Cindy Holscher on November 8, 2016.

Sources

External links

State Legislature Page
Official website
Midwest Democracy
Votesmart
Ballotpedia
Follow the Money
Political Chips
Open States
Smac PTA profile

Republican Party members of the Kansas House of Representatives
Living people
People from Johnson County, Kansas
21st-century American politicians
Women state legislators in Kansas
21st-century American women politicians
Conservatism in the United States
Wayne State College alumni
1975 births